Down in Albion is the debut album by Babyshambles, Pete Doherty's post-Libertines band.

Down in Albion was released on 14 November 2005 on Rough Trade Records, although it was leaked on to the Internet on 19 October 2005. Produced by Mick Jones, Down in Albion contains a rerecorded version of their second single "Killamangiro" as well as a reggae track, "Pentonville".  The influence of The Clash has been noted on songs such as "À rebours" and "The 32nd of December". The inclusion of "Albion" is controversial among fans, due to the song's history as a fan favorite from the days of The Libertines. 

The first track, "La Belle et la Bête" (French for "Beauty and the Beast"), features the vocals of Doherty's then-girlfriend Kate Moss, and "Pentonville" was written by Doherty and The General, a friend he met whilst an inmate in Pentonville Prison. The album was seen as a move away from The Libertines' style of music.

The artwork for the album was created by Doherty.

Track listing

All tracks by Pete Doherty unless otherwise stated.

 "La Belle et la Bête" (featuring Kate Moss) (Pete Doherty, Chevalley, Peter Wolfe) – 5:05
 "Fuck Forever" (Doherty, Patrick Walden) – 4:37
 "À rebours"  – 3:23
 "The 32nd of December"  – 3:08
 "Pipedown" (Doherty, Walden) – 2:35
 "Sticks and Stones" (Doherty, Wolfe) – 4:51
 "Killamangiro"  – 3:13
 "8 Dead Boys"  – 4:16
 "In Love with a Feeling"  – 2:51
 "Pentonville" Feat. The General (General Santana) – 3:49
 "What Katy Did Next" (Doherty, Alan Wass) – 3:07
 "Albion"  – 5:24
 "Back from the Dead" (Doherty, Wolfe) – 2:52
 "Loyalty Song" (Doherty, Walden) – 3:32
 "Up the Morning"  – 5:43
 "Merry Go Round"  – 5:22

Personnel
 Peter Doherty – vocals, guitar, artwork
 Patrick Walden – Lead guitar
 Adam Ficek – drums
 Drew McConnell – bass guitar
 Kate Moss – vocals on track 1
 General Santana – vocals on track 10
 Barriemore Barlow – gong on track 6
Technical
 Mick Jones – producer
 Bill Price – mixing, recorded by
 Adam Fuest – recorded by
 Iain Gore – recorded by
 Daniel Parry – assistant engineer
 George Williams – assistant engineer
 Matt Paul – assistant engineer
 Jeff Teader – layout
 Hedi Slimane – photos

Singles
Killamangiro (11 November), (2004), (Rough Trade) UK #8
Fuck Forever (15 August), (2005), (Rough Trade) UK #4
Albion (28 November), (2005), (Rough Trade) UK #8

Chart performance

See also
Babyshambles discography

References

2005 debut albums
Babyshambles albums
Rough Trade Records albums